Don Martin may refer to:
 Don Martin (cartoonist) (1931–2000), cartoonist for Mad Magazine
 Don Martin (footballer) (1944–2009), English professional footballer for Northampton Town and Blackburn Rovers
 Don Martin (basketball) (1920–1997), American professional basketball player
 Don Martin (American football) (born 1949), professional American football player
 Don Martin (journalist), Canadian television and newspaper journalist
 Don Martin (field hockey) (born 1940), former Australian field hockey player
 Don Martin, Norwegian rapper, ex-member of Gatas Parlament

Donald Martin may refer to:
 Donald A. Martin (born 1940), set theorist and philosopher of mathematics at UCLA
 Donald Charles Martin (1849–1888), lawyer and political figure in Prince Edward Island
 Donald Paul Martin (1940–2019), founder of Martin Research Ltd.
 Donald Martin (screenwriter), Canadian screenwriter
 Donald Martin (bishop) (1873–1938), Scottish Roman Catholic clergyman

Dino Martin may refer to:
 Dino Martin (1920–1999), college basketball and college coach, given name is Don Martin

Don Martin using the Spanish honorific may refer to:
 Martim Afonso de Castro (1560–1607), nobleman and commander of the Portuguese Navy
 Martín Alfonso de León (1210–c. 1270/5), Spanish nobleman
 Martín Cortés de Albacar (1510–1582), Spanish cosmographer
 Martín Cortés (son of doña Marina) (1523–?)
 Martín Cortés, 2nd Marquis of the Valley of Oaxaca (1532–1589)
 Martín Casillas (1556–1618), Spanish architect

See also 
 Don Martineau (1952–2006), ice hockey player
 Don Martindale (born 1963), assistant coach for the Denver Broncos
 Donald Martino (1931–2005), Pulitzer Prize winning American composer